The United States Attorney for the District of Hawaii — also known as the United States Attorney and U.S. Attorney —  is the chief law enforcement officer representing the federal government in the United States District Court for the District of Hawaii and principal authority of the United States Department of Justice in the state of Hawaii. The United States attorney administers the duties of the office from the Prince Kuhio Federal Building in downtown Honolulu near the Aloha Tower and Honolulu Harbor.

The Judiciary Act of 1789 describes the role of the United States Attorney as, "A person learned in the law to act as attorney for the United States whose duty it shall be to prosecute in each district all delinquents for crimes and offenses cognizable under the authority of the United States and all civil actions in which the United States shall be concerned." The United States Attorney is appointed by the President of the United States and upon confirmation of the United States Senate serves a term of four years. The United States attorney has been historically chosen from the same political party that the President professes membership.

The United States Attorney administers a staff consisting of twenty-eight Assistant United States Attorneys. The United States Attorney has ordinary jurisdiction over all civilian and military Special Assistant United States Attorneys and serves as a member of the Executive Office for U.S. Attorneys (EOUSA),

List of U.S. Attorneys for the District of Hawaii

Steven S. Alm: 19942001
Edward H. Kubo, Jr.: December 7, 20012009
Florence T. Nakakuni: September 30, 2009March 11, 2017
Elliot Enoki (Acting): March 11, 2017January 3, 2018
Kenji Price: January 3, 2018February 21, 2021
Judith A. Philips (Acting): February 21, 2021January 3, 2022
Clare E. Connors: January 3, 2022Present

External links
 United States Attorney for the District of Hawaii